The Office of the Attorney-General & Ministry of Legal Affairs provides legal advice to the government of the Bahamas in national and international matters.

List of Attorneys-General of the Colony of the Bahamas 
This is an incomplete listing of Attorneys-General before 1973.

 William Wylly (1799-1821)
 William Rees-Davies (c. 1897-1902)
 Frederick Chester Wells-Durrant (1909-1921)
 John Bowes Griffin (1936-1939)
 Lionel (L.A.W.) Orr (1955-1963)
 Kendal Isaacs (1963-1965)

List of Attorneys-General & Ministry of Legal Affairs (Post-Independence in 1973) 

 Paul Adderley (1973-1989)  [1st Attorney General - Post Independence]
 Sean G.A. McWeeney (1989-1992)
 Orville Turnquest (1992-1995)
 Brent Symonette (1995)
 Janet Bostwick (1995-1997) [1st female]
 Tennyson Wells (1997-2001)
 Carl Wilshire Bethel (2001-2002)
 Alfred Sears (2002-2006)
 Allyson Maynard Gibson (2006-2007)
 Claire Hepburn (2007-2008)
 Michael Barnett (2008-2009)
 John Delaney (2009-2012)
 Allyson Maynard Gibson (2012-2017)
 Carl Wilshire Bethel (2017–2021)
 Ryan Pinder (2021–present)

See also 

 Justice ministry
 Politics of the Bahamas

References 

Attorneys General of the Bahamas
Government of the Bahamas
Justice ministers
Bahamian lawyers
Law of the Bahamas